The Father is a 2020 psychological drama film directed by Florian Zeller, in his directorial debut; he co-wrote the screenplay with fellow playwright Christopher Hampton based on Zeller's 2012 play Le Père, which is part of a trilogy that also includes Le Fils and The Mother. A French-British co-production, the film stars Anthony Hopkins, Olivia Colman, Mark Gatiss, Imogen Poots, Rufus Sewell, and Olivia Williams, and follows an octogenarian Welsh man living with dementia. 

The Father premiered at the 2020 Sundance Film Festival on 27 January 2020 and was released by Sony Pictures Classics in the United States on 26 February 2021, in France on 26 May 2021 by UGC Distribution, and in the United Kingdom on 11 June 2021 by Lionsgate UK. The film grossed $28 million on a $6 million budget and was acclaimed by critics, who lauded the performances of Hopkins and Colman, as well as the production values and its portrayal of dementia.

At the 93rd Academy Awards, Hopkins won Best Actor and Zeller and Hampton won Best Adapted Screenplay; the film received six nominations in total, including Best Picture and Best Supporting Actress (Colman). At the 78th Golden Globe Awards, the film received four nominations, including Best Motion Picture – Drama, and it received six nominations at the 74th British Academy Film Awards, winning Best Actor (Hopkins) and Best Adapted Screenplay. In addition, Hopkins and Colman were nominated for Outstanding Leading Actor and Outstanding Supporting Actress respectively at the 27th Screen Actors Guild Awards.

Plot
Anne visits her father Anthony in his flat after he has driven away the latest of several caregivers. He has dementia and constantly forgets important life events and where things are around his flat, including his watch. He tells Anne he believes his caregiver stole his watch and that he will never move out of his flat. She tells Anthony she is moving to Paris to be with a man, which confuses Anthony since he does not recall any men in her life since the end of her marriage to James. Anne says that if he keeps refusing to have a caregiver, she will have to move him into a nursing home.

The next day, Anthony encounters an unknown man, Paul, in his flat. Paul says he is Anne's husband and that Anthony is living in their flat. Anne returns but appears to Anthony as a different woman. When a new caregiver, Laura, arrives for an interview, Anthony tells Laura he was a professional dancer and insists he does not need any assistance. Anthony later says Laura reminds him of his other daughter Lucy, whom he has not seen for a long time.

Anthony is taken to a doctor and rejects the idea that he has memory problems. Later, he tells Laura how proud he is of Lucy, a painter. She tells him she is sorry about Lucy's accident, but Anthony is confused as he has no recollection of the accident. Over the course of the film, it becomes clear that Anthony has really been living with Anne for years, but believes he still lives in his own flat. After Anne comes home, she and her husbandwho is sometimes called Paul and sometimes James, and appears as two different menhave an argument over a holiday that had to be cancelled because of Anthony's needs, and about Anne's sacrifices for her father. Paul asks Anthony how long he plans to stay in their flat and annoy everyone; this sequence of events is repeated later, and on the second occasion Paul slaps him.

Anthony wakes up and walks out of the flat, finding himself in a hospital hallway. He remembers Lucy lying in a hospital bed with blood on her face. He then wakes up in a completely different bedroom, which is in a nursing home. His nurse arrives, who earlier appeared as both Anne and Laura, but identifies herself as Catherine. She informs him that Anne lives in Paris and visits on occasional weekends. Another nurse named Bill also visits, identical to one of the men who earlier appeared to be Anne's husband. Anthony breaks down in tears over his inability to understand what is happening to him, as well as Anne's disappearance. He says he wants his mother and that he is "losing his leaves, the branches, the wind and the rain". Catherine comforts him and tells him she will take him out to the park later.

Cast
 Anthony Hopkins as Anthony Miller
 Olivia Colman as Anne 
 Rufus Sewell as Paul
 Imogen Poots as Laura
 Olivia Williams as The Woman
 Mark Gatiss as The Man
 Ayesha Dharker as Dr Sarai
 Adnan Kundi as Passerby (uncredited)
 Brian Rodger as Hospital Visitor (uncredited)
 Evie Wray as Lucy (uncredited)

Production
It was announced in May 2019 that Florian Zeller was to direct a screenplay with Christopher Hampton based on his play. Anthony Hopkins and Olivia Colman were cast in the film. Olivia Williams, Rufus Sewell, Imogen Poots and Mark Gatiss joined later that month, with filming beginning on 13 May. Filming locations included West London Film Studios, and Hayes, Hillingdon.

Release
The Father had its world premiere at the Sundance Film Festival on 27 January 2020. Prior to this, Sony Pictures Classics and Lionsgate acquired U.S. and U.K. distribution rights to the film, respectively. It also screened at the Toronto International Film Festival on 14 September 2020 and at the AFI Fest in October 2020.

In the United States, the film began a limited release in New York City and Los Angeles on 26 February 2021, before expanding on 12 March and then being available on premium video on demand starting 26 March, after originally being scheduled to be released on 18 December 2020. The film was released in India on 23 April 2021 and in the United Kingdom on 11 June 2021, delayed from earlier release dates of 8 January and 12 March in response to lockdowns as result of a second-wave of the COVID-19 pandemic. The film was released in mainland China on 18 June 2021.

Reception

Box office 
The Father grossed $2.1 million in the United States and Canada, and $26.1 million in other territories, for a worldwide total of $28.2 million.

In the film's opening weekend in the United States, the film made $433,611 from 865 theatres, finishing eighth at the box office. The weekend following its six Oscar nominations, the film made $355,000 from 937 theatres. Following its two Oscar wins, the film made $147,000 from 713 theatres, for a running total of $1.9 million.

In Spain the film made $171,901 in its opening weekend from 156 theatres, then $160,378 in its second and $54,901 in its third.

Critical response 

The website's critics consensus reads: "Led by stellar performances and artfully helmed by writer-director Florian Zeller, The Father presents a devastatingly empathetic portrayal of dementia." Metacritic assigned it a Weighted arithmetic mean score of 88 out of 100 based on 51 critics, indicating "universal acclaim". According to PostTrak, 84% of audience members gave the film a positive score, with 54% saying they would definitely recommend it.

Writing for Variety, Owen Gleiberman said "The Father does something that few movies about mental deterioration in old age have brought off in quite this way, or this fully. It places us in the mind of someone losing his mind—and it does so by revealing that mind to be a place of seemingly rational and coherent experience." For The Guardian, Benjamin Lee wrote of Hopkins's performance: "It's astounding, heartbreaking work, watching him try to rationally explain to himself and those around him what he's experiencing. In some of the film's most quietly upsetting moments, his world has shifted yet again but he remains silent, knowing that any attempt to question what he's woken up to will only fall on deaf ears. Hopkins runs the full gamut of emotions from fury to outrage to longing for his mother like a little child and never once does it feel like a constructed character bit, despite our association with him as an actor with a storied career."

Todd McCarthy of The Hollywood Reporter wrote: "The best film about the wages of aging since Amour eight years ago, The Father takes a bracingly insightful, subtle and nuanced look at encroaching dementia and the toll it takes on those in close proximity to the afflicted. Fronted by a stupendous performance from Anthony Hopkins as a proud [man] in denial of his condition, this penetrating work marks an outstanding directorial debut by the play's French author Florian Zeller."

Writing for Indiewire, David Ehrlich said: "Zeller adapts his award-winning play of the same name with steely vision and remarkable confidence, as the writer-director makes use of the camera like he's been standing behind one for his entire life. ... In Zeller's hands, what appears to be a conventional-seeming portrait of an unmoored old man as he rages against his daughter and caretaker slowly reveals itself to be the brilliant study of a mind at sea, and of the indescribable pain of watching someone drown."

Writing for The New York Times, Jeannette Catsoulis said The Father is "stupendously effective and profoundly upsetting" and described it as a "majestic depiction of things falling away". The Guardian Anne Billson ranked Hopkins's performance in the film as the best of his career.

Selections
 Sundance Film Festival: official selection
 Toronto International Film Festival: official selection
 Telluride Film Festival: official selection
 San Sebastián International Film Festival: Pearls section
 Zurich Film Festival: official selection
 Hamptons International Film Festival: official selection
 Dinard British Film Festival

Accolades

Prequel
A follow-up film, The Son based on Zeller's 2018 play, which is framed as a prequel to The Father, with Hopkins reprising his role as Anthony in a cameo and Zeller returning as writer and director, was released on 25 November 2022.

References

External links
 
 
 Script 

2020 films
2020 directorial debut films
2020 drama films
2020s psychological drama films
British psychological drama films
British films based on plays
English-language French films
Films about father–daughter relationships
Films about Alzheimer's disease
Films directed by Florian Zeller
Films featuring a Best Actor Academy Award-winning performance
Films scored by Ludovico Einaudi
Films set in London
Films set in apartment buildings
Films shot in London
Films whose writer won the Best Adapted Screenplay Academy Award
French films based on plays
French psychological drama films
2020 independent films
Lionsgate films
Film4 Productions films
Orange Studio films
Sony Pictures Classics films
Canal+ films
2020s English-language films
Films postponed due to the COVID-19 pandemic
2020s British films
2020s French films